The School Mathematics Study Group (SMSG) was an American academic think tank focused on the subject of reform in mathematics education.  Directed by Edward G. Begle and financed by the National Science Foundation, the group was created in the wake of the Sputnik crisis in 1958 and tasked with creating and implementing mathematics curricula for primary and secondary education, which it did until its termination in 1977.  

The efforts of the SMSG yielded a reform in mathematics education known as New Math which was promulgated in a series of reports, culminating in a series published by Random House called the New Mathematical Library (Vol. 1 is Ivan Niven's Numbers: Rational and Irrational).  In the early years, SMSG also produced a set of draft textbooks in typewritten paperback format for elementary, middle and high school students. 

Perhaps the most authoritative collection of materials from the School Mathematics Study Group is now housed in the Archives of American Mathematics in the University of Texas at Austin's Center for American History.

See also
 Foundations of geometry

Further reading 
 1958 Letter from Ralph A. Raimi to Fred Quigley concerning the New Math
 Whatever Happened to the New Math by Ralph A. Raimi
 Some Technical Commentaries on Mathematics Education and History by Ralph A. Raimi

External links 
 The SMSG Collection at The Center for American History at UT
 Archives of American Mathematics at the Center for American History at UT

Mathematics education
Curricula